Sizzle Beach, U.S.A., also known as Malibu Hot Summer, is a 1981 independent film directed by Richard Brander, and starring Robert Acey, Terry Congie, Leslie Brander, Roselyn Royce and Kevin Costner in his film debut. It was not released until 1986 after Costner became an actor. His biography says it was filmed between 1978 and 1979. It was referenced in the Mystery Science Theater 3000 episode Alien From L.A., but was never parodied on any incarnation of this show itself.

Costner was reportedly uncomfortable when filming a sex scene in the film. In the late 1980s, Costner tried to buy the rights to the film so he could keep it out of public view, but Troma Entertainment declined it.

Plot
Three young women team up to rent a beach house in Malibu, California: One of them lands a job in a high school thanks to an investment broker she meets jogging along the beach, another is taking acting lessons and enjoys horseback riding, though the young owner of the stable, John Logan (Kevin Costner), turns out to be more interesting than the riding itself and the third woman practices her guitar, shuns the owner of the studio where she records, and hangs out with her hunk cousin Steve, the fourth roommate in the house.

Reception 
TV Guide panned the film, writing that it was "Inept from the opening titles to the closing credits."

References

External links

1981 films
American independent films
Troma Entertainment films
1980s English-language films
1980s American films